The Aberdare Valley Association Football League is a football league affiliated to the South Wales FA and provides football at the seventh level of the Welsh football league system. The league's boundaries stretch from Rhigos in the north to Carnetown, Abercynon in the South of the Cynon Valley.

As of 2015 the league is only responsible for providing Mini football (Under 7 to Under 11) and Senior Men's football to the area. Junior (Under 12 to Under 16) football became the responsibility of the newly formed Aberdare Rhondda Junior Football League now called the Cynon Rhondda Merthyr Junior Football League.

Division One
As of the 2021–22 season, the league consists of 14 clubs:

Member Clubs 2022–23

AFC Aberaman
Aberdare Town reserves
AFC Abercynon
AFC Abercynon reserves
Butchers Arms  
Carnetown FC 
Cwmbach Royal Stars reserves
FC Abercwmboi 
FC Cwmaman reserves
FC Cwmaman thirds
Gadlys Rovers AFC
Hirwaun FC
Penrhiwceiber reserves
Penrhiwceiber Navigation
Penywaun FC
Royal Oak

Promotion and Relegation
Promotion from the Premier Division is possible to the South Wales Alliance League, with the champion of the league playing the other tier 7 champions from the South Wales regional leagues via play-off games to determine promotion.

Champions (Top Division)

1905–06: – Aberdare Crescents
1906–07: – Aberdare Crescents
1907–08: – 
1908–09: – No competition
1909–10: – 
1924-25:
1930-31: – Hirwaun K.B.R.
1933-34: – Hirwaun K.B.R.
1934-35: – Hirwaun K.B.R.
1936-37: – Hirwaun Welfare
1946-47: – Hirwaun Welfare
1968–69: – Ivy Bush
2001-02: – Hirwaun Welfare
2005–06: – AFC Abercynon 
2006–07: – Abernant Rovers '97
2007–08: – Aberaman
2008–09: – Aberaman
2009–10: – Perthcelyn United
2010–11: – Perthcelyn United 
2011–12: – AFC Abercynon 'A'
2012–13: – Tynte Rovers
2013–14: – FC Abercwmboi 'A'
2014–15: – Carnetown 'A'
2015–16: – Carnetown 'A'
2016–17: – FC Abercwmboi 'A'
2017–18: – Hirwaun Sports FC 
2018–19: – FC Abercwmboi 'A' 
2019–20: – AFC Abercynon 'A' 
2020–22: – Cwmbach Royal Stars reserves

References

External links
 Aberdare Valley League
 Aberdare Valley League Twitter

8
1906 establishments in Wales
Sports leagues established in 1906